Nautgardsoksli is a mountain in Lom Municipality in Innlandet county, Norway. The mountain is surrounded by several other notable mountains including Stornubben and Hindnubben to the northeast, Nautgardstinden to the east, Besshø to the south, and Austre Hestlægerhøe and Vestre Hestlægerhøe to the west.

See also
List of mountains of Norway

References

Lom, Norway
Mountains of Innlandet